Kei Francesco Cozzolino (born in Shinjuku, Tokyo, November 9, 1987) is a Japanese racing driver who currently competes in the Super GT series with PACIFIC NAC CARGUY Racing Team with the Ferrari 488 GT3 EVO.

Racing career

Karting
Cozzolino started karting at the age of 9. He competed and won in various competitions in classes in Japan and around the world. His karting career ended in 2005 when he switched to racing cars.

Junior formula
In 2006, Cozzolino made his debut in auto racing, in the Formula Toyota series, during the second round of the championship at Sendai Hi-Land Raceway. Cozzolino finished tenth out of eleven finishers. In 2007, he competed in the Formula Challenge Japan and the Formula Toyota classes. In the Formula Challenge Japan, supported by Nissan, Toyota and Honda, Cozzolino won one race. All the drivers who entered both the Formula Toyota and Formula Challenge Japan series were supported by Toyota. This was to promote the Formula Challenge Japan as a replacement of the Formula Toyota after the series disbandment.  In the final season of the Formula Toyota, Cozzolino won the title. Cozzolino was strong all season long, but Keisuke Kunimoto had the lead before the final round of the season. At the final round of the season at Fuji International Speedway Cozzolino qualified second and Kunimoto sixth. After a strong race Cozzolino won the race, KyoYu did not finish the race, thus the championship was decided in Cozzolino's favour.

Formula 3
After his 2007 Formula Toyota championship the young driver graduated to the All-Japan Formula Three Championship driving Now Motor Sport in a Dallara F308. As a result of winning the championship Cozzolino tested for the Toyota Tom's Formula Nippon factory team. In his debut year in Formula 3 the young Italian achieved four podium finishes and a ninth place in the championship. He also participated in the 2008 Macau Grand Prix Formula Three where he finished fifteenth. For the 2009 season, Cozzolino switched to the only Honda powered entry Toda Racing. He achieved his first win in Formula Three during the round at Twin Ring Motegi. But with the Toyota Tom's team dominating the championship Cozzolino was best of the rest finishing fourth.

Formula Nippon (Super Formula)
For the 2010 season, Cozzolino graduated to the Formula Nippon, the highest racing class in Japan. Cozzolino participated in a Toyota powered Swift FN09 entered by Team LeMans. His best finish was a fourth place at Autopolis. During the non-championship Fuji Sprint Cup he achieved his first pole-position and eventually finished tenth in the standings.

World Touring Car Championship
After more than a year without racing Cozzolino was announced as a replacement of Alberto Cerqui for the Guia Race of Macau. 29 drivers attempted to qualify for the event of which 23 could start the race, Cozzolino qualified 22nd. In the first race he had an accident after seven laps but he was qualified 20th. In the second race he was the last running driver in 19th place 2 laps behind the winning driver.

Asian Le Mans Series
In 2018–2019, the Ferrari 488 GT3 of the privately run CAR GUY team, with fellow team mates Takeshi Kimura and James Calado, win all four legs of the 2018–19 Asian Le Mans Series. The team achieves an auto-invitation to enter into the 2019 24 hours of Le Mans.

24 hours of Le Mans
Cozzolino has made 2 appearances in Le Mans (2019 and 2020). In 2019, he finishes 5th in class. At his second attempt in 2020, the Ferrari 488 GTE EVO of the MR Racing team, suffers a mechanical problem early on the race and forced to be 7 laps behind the leader. In the end the team retires due to a gearbox failure on lap 172.

FIA World Endurance Championship 
After his remarkable achievement in 2019, Cozzolino signed to drive for the MR Racing team in FIA WEC 2019-2020 season. Pairing up with Olivier Beretta and Motoaki Ishikawa, the team's best finish was 3rd in the opening round at Silverstone. However later into the season, MR Racing has withdrawn from the series due to Covid-19. Cozzolino returns to the final round in Bahrain with Red River Sport.

SUPER GT 
His debut in Super GT was at his promotion to become a Lamborghini Young Driver in 2016. Cozzolino participates in only 2 rounds with the Lamborghini Huracan GT3 of the Direction Racing team. He returns to the series in 2020, to replace Nicki Thiim in the Pacific - D'station Racing team's Aston Martin Vantage GT3, pairing up with the team's ace driver Tomonobu Fujii. 2021 he debuts the Ferrari 488 GT3 Evo with the PACIFIC NAC CARGUY Racing Team, pairing up with 2012 Super GT 300 Champion Naoki Yokomizo.

Racing record

Formula Toyota results

Japanese Formula 3 results

Formula Nippon results

FIA World Endurance Championship results

24 Hours of Le Mans results

Super GT results

* Season still in progress.

References

External links
 KEI COZZOLINO official WEBSITE
 Career statistics at DriverDB.com

1987 births
Living people
People from Shinjuku
Japanese people of Italian descent
Japanese emigrants to Italy
Formula Challenge Japan drivers
Japanese Formula 3 Championship drivers
Formula Nippon drivers
World Touring Car Championship drivers
Super GT drivers
24 Hours of Le Mans drivers
Asian Le Mans Series drivers
FIA World Endurance Championship drivers
Team LeMans drivers
Euronova Racing drivers
AF Corse drivers
Le Mans Cup drivers
Lamborghini Super Trofeo drivers